Princess Amalie Antoinette Karoline Adrienne of Hohenzollern-Sigmaringen (30 April 1815, Sigmaringen, Principality of Hohenzollern-Sigmaringen – 14 January 1841, Sigmaringen, Principality of Hohenzollern-Sigmaringen) was a member of the House of Hohenzollern-Sigmaringen and a Princess of Hohenzollern-Sigmaringen by birth. Through her marriage to Prince Eduard of Saxe-Altenburg, Amalie was also a member of the House of Saxe-Altenburg and Princess of Saxe-Altenburg. Amalie was a grand-niece of Joachim Murat, King of the Two Sicilies from 1808 to 1815 and a brother-in-law of Napoleon Bonaparte, through marriage to Napoleon's youngest sister, Caroline Bonaparte.

Family
Amalie was the fourth and youngest child of Charles, Prince of Hohenzollern-Sigmaringen and his first wife Marie Antoinette Murat.

Marriage and issue
Amalie married Prince Eduard of Saxe-Altenburg, seventh but fourth surviving son of Frederick, Duke of Saxe-Hildburghausen (of Saxe-Altenburg from 1826) and Duchess Charlotte Georgine of Mecklenburg-Strelitz, on 25 July 1835 in Sigmaringen. Amalie and Eduard had four children:

 Therese Amalie Karoline Josephine Antoinette (b. Ansbach, 21 December 1836 - d. Stockholm, 9 November 1914), married on 16 April 1864 to Prince August of Sweden.
 Antoinette Charlotte Marie Josephine Karoline Frida (b. Bamberg, 17 April 1838 - d. Berchtesgaden, 13 October 1908), married on 22 April 1854 to Frederick I, Duke of Anhalt.
 Ludwig Joseph Karl Georg Friedrich (b. Bamberg, 24 September 1839 - d. Munich, 13 February 1844).
 Johann Friedrich Joseph Karl (b. Sigmaringen, 8 January 1841 - d. Munich, 25 February 1844).

Ancestry

References

1815 births
1841 deaths
House of Saxe-Altenburg
Princesses of Hohenzollern-Sigmaringen
People from Sigmaringen
Princesses of Saxe-Altenburg
German people of French descent
Daughters of monarchs